Wiang Sa is a district (amphoe) in the central part of Nan province, northern Thailand.

Geography
Neighboring districts are, from the south clockwise, Na Noi of Nan Province, Rong Kwang, Song of Phrae province, Ban Luang, Mueang Nan, Phu Phiang and Mae Charim of Nan Province. To the east it borders Xaignabouli province of Laos.

The eastern part of the district is in the Luang Prabang Range mountain area of the Thai highlands.

History
The minor district Mueang Sa was created in 1908, consisting of the seven tambons (sub-districts): Mueang Sa, Ai Na Lai, Ban San, Ban Khueng, Pong Sanuk, Nam Khao, and Lai Na split off from Mueang Nan District. In 1909 it was upgraded to a full district. In 1917 it was renamed Phun Yuen (บุญยืน), as the district office was in that tambon. In 1939 it was again renamed with its historical name, only leaving out the word Mueang which was reserved for the capital districts of provinces. The district was renamed Wiang Sa on 23 January 1986.

Administration

Central administration 
Wiang Sa is divided into 17 sub-districts (tambons), which are further subdivided into 128 administrative villages (mubans).

Local administration 
There are three sub-district municipalities (thesaban tambons) in the district:
 Wiang Sa consisting of parts of sub-district Klang Wiang.
 Klang Wiang consisting of sub-district Pong Sanuk and parts of sub-district Klang Wiang.
 Khueng consisting of sub-district Khueng.

There are 13 sub-district administrative organizations (SAO) in the district:
 Lai Nan consisting of sub-district Lai Nan.
 Tan Chum consisting of sub-district Tan Chum.
 Na Lueang consisting of sub-district Na Lueang.
 San consisting of sub-district San.
 Nam Muap consisting of sub-district Nam Muap, San Na Nong Mai.
 Nam Pua consisting of sub-district Nam Pua.
 Yap Hua Na consisting of sub-district Yap Hua Na.
 Ai Na Lai consisting of sub-district Ai Na Lai.
 Mae Khaning consisting of sub-district Mae Khaning.
 Mae Sakhon consisting of sub-district Mae Sakhon.
 Chom Chan consisting of sub-district Chom Chan.
 Mae Sa consisting of sub-district Mae Sa.
 Thung Si Thong consisting of sub-district Thung Si Thong.

References

External links

amphoe.com

Wiang Sa